The 1986 California lieutenant gubernatorial election was held on November 4, 1986. Incumbent Democrat Leo T. McCarthy defeated Republican nominee, former Lieutenant Governor Mike Curb with 53.94% of the vote.

Primary elections
Primary elections were held on June 3, 1986.

Republican primary

Candidates
Mike Curb, former Lieutenant Governor
H. L. Richardson, State Senator

Results

General election

Candidates
Major party candidates
Leo T. McCarthy, Democratic
Mike Curb, Republican

Other candidates
James C. Griffin, American Independent 
Norma Jean Almodovar, Libertarian
Clyde Kuhn, Peace and Freedom

Results

References

California
1986
Lieutenant